Luke Thompson (born 8 February 1991) is an Australian rules footballer who played for the Adelaide Football Club in the Australian Football League.

He was drafted in 2010 by the Adelaide Crows as their 1st pick in the rookie draft. He played as a defender but could also play up forward if needed. He had worn three guernsey numbers 1, 28 and 6. He was delisted at the conclusion of the 2014 AFL season.

Statistics
  Statistics are correct to the end of the 2014 season

|- style="background-color: #EAEAEA"
! scope="row" | 
|  || 28 || 11 || 2 || 2 || 75 || 71 || 146 || 51 || 19 || 0.2 || 0.2 || 6.8 || 6.4 || 13.3 || 4.6 || 1.7
|- 
! scope="row" | 
|  || 6 || 3 || 0 || 0 || 17 || 18 || 35 || 9 || 7 || 0.0 || 0.0 || 5.7 || 6.0 || 11.7 || 3.0 || 2.3
|- style="background-color: #EAEAEA"
! scope="row" | 
|  || 6 || 0 || — || — || — || — || — || — || — || — || — || — || — || — || — || — 
|- 
! scope="row" | 
|  || 6 || 6 || 0 || 0 || 27 || 27 || 54 || 27 || 14 || 0.0 || 0.0 || 4.5 || 4.5 || 9.0 || 4.5 || 2.3
|- class="sortbottom"
! colspan=3| Career
! 20
! 2
! 2
! 119
! 116
! 235
! 77
! 40
! 0.1
! 0.1
! 6.0
! 5.8
! 11.8
! 3.9
! 2.0
|}

References

External links

Australian rules footballers from Victoria (Australia)
Adelaide Football Club players
Geelong Falcons players
1991 births
Living people
Adelaide Football Club (SANFL) players
Woodville-West Torrens Football Club players
People from Wangaratta